is a 2013 role-playing video game developed by Prope and published by Bandai Namco Games under the Bandai label for the PlayStation Portable. The story of the game is based on the first Digimon anime series of the same name. It includes dialogue with voice acting from the main voice acting team of the anime. The opening theme song for the anime, Butter-Fly by Kōji Wada, and the insert song used for digivolutions, Brave Heart by Ayumi Miyazaki, are also featured. The game is part of the series' 15th anniversary celebration and was released in Japan on January 13, 2013.

Gameplay

Initially, only seven characters and their Digimon partners are available. During the third arc, the eighth character, Hikari, becomes available. During the course of one episode, one character assumes the role of team leader and two other characters' Digimon partners join in battle. Occasionally, the team leader will be able to talk to the other characters mid-episode. By choosing the right answer, the relationship level between those two characters is increased. This has multiple benefits, like an assist attack in-battle and unlocking extra episodes after the main story.

A battle is between a maximum of six Digimon, three on each side. By default, the player controls the Digimon of the team leader and can take manual control of the other partner Digimon through the strategy menu. It has a turn-based system wherein each Digimon can use a regular attack, use special attacks, use items, guard against an attack, or attempt to run from a wild battle.

After completing a main episode unlocking the evolution, the Digimon can digivolve in-battle into their Champion, Ultimate or Mega forms. This significantly increases stats. Evolution consumes special points (SP) and doesn't use up a turn. Post-battle, the Digimon revert to their Rookie forms. Occasionally (for example during the first time a Digimon evolves mid-story), they evolve pre-battle. The evolution sequences from the anime were completely reanimated for this game, unlike the non-credit version of the opening movie of the anime which was only cropped to fit the 16×9 aspect ratio of a PSP screen. These sequences are only shown once during the initial evolution, but can be viewed anytime from the library.

Story

The game retells the story of the 1999 anime series, in which seven children; Tai (Taichi), Matt (Yamato), Sora, Izzy (Koushiro), Mimi, Joe and T.K. (Takeru), are mysteriously transported to the Digital World, where they meet monster companions known as Digimon. Using the power of the Digivice to evolve their Digimon partners into more powerful forms, Tai, his friends and their Digimon companions must work together in order to save both the Digital World and their own. The game also features the story of the film, Our War Game!, as well as original scenarios exclusive to this game.

Development
Digimon Adventure was first announced in an August 2012 issue of Japanese V Jump magazine as part of the franchise's 15th anniversary, and would be designed as a re-creation of the original Digimon anime series "in full" for the PlayStation Portable. Game developer Yuji Naka announced via Twitter that his own studio, Prope, would be developing the title as the company's first role-playing game. A trailer was released the following September, revealing that the original main voice actors from the animated version would reprise their roles for the title, which includes over 70 hours of total voice audio. In addition to the series itself, the developers also included a scenario based on the 2000 Digimon film Our War Game!, as well as bonus "sub-episode quests".

First-print copies of the game came with a product code for a PlayStation Portable download title called Digivice Ver. Portable, an emulated version of the Digimon virtual pet device, as well a voucher which could be redeemed for in-game cards for the GREE mobile platform social game Digimon Collectors.
An unofficial English translation was released in 2018 translating all the text and graphics into English.

Reception

Digimon Adventure sold 47,807 copies in its debut week, debuting as the third highest-selling game of that period in the Media Create software charts. The game sold a total of 70,172 copies in the region before falling from the top 30 software charts the following month, and received a 29 out of 40 total score from Japanese Weekly Famitsu magazine based on individual reviews of 8, 7, 7, and 7.

References

External links
 

2013 video games
Bandai Namco games
Digimon video games
Dungeon crawler video games
Japan-exclusive video games
PlayStation Portable games
PlayStation Network games
Crossover role-playing video games
Video games developed in Japan
Video games about parallel universes